Erik Bartnes (27 November 1939 – 26 September 2020) was a Norwegian farmer and politician for the Centre Party.

He is a son of Inge Einarsen Bartnes and father of Inge Bartnes, Anne Margrethe Bartnes, Tore Bartnes and Lars Erik Bartnes. He was from Beitstad in Steinkjer.

He has worked in the Norwegian Agrarian Association and been mayor of Steinkjer. Following the 2003 county council election he was appointed county mayor of Nord-Trøndelag. He did not run for re-election in 2007.

He has also been a board member of the Regional Development Fund.

References

1939 births
2020 deaths
People from Steinkjer
Norwegian farmers
Chairmen of County Councils of Norway
Centre Party (Norway) politicians
Mayors of places in Nord-Trøndelag